Xiong Yao (born 24 October 1991) is a Chinese judoka.

She is the silver medallist of the 2018 Judo Grand Prix The Hague in the -48 kg category.

References

External links
 

1991 births
Living people
Chinese female judoka
Judoka at the 2018 Asian Games
Asian Games competitors for China
21st-century Chinese women